Rossell is a surname of Catalan origin. A variant is Rosell. Notable people with the surname include:

Juan Rossell (born 1969), Cuban volleyball player
Kristin Brooks Rossell (1969–1998), woman who committed suicide
Marina Rossell (born 1954), Spanish singer
William Trent Rossell (1849–1919), American army officer in the U.S. Army Corps of Engineers
Lauren Michele Rossell (born 1984), American

Also, as Røssell, a Danish name:
Dorthe Emilie Røssell (born 1934), Danish author and resistance member during the Second World War

See also
Rosell, a surname

Catalan-language surnames